Novi Kozarci is a village in Serbia. It is located in the Municipality of Kikinda, North Banat District, Autonomous Province of Vojvodina. The village has an ethnic Serb majority (93.19%) and a population of 1,912 (2011 census).

Name
The name of the village is derived from Mount Kozara in Bosnia and Herzegovina, and means 'new Kozarans'. Serbs from the Kozara region settled the village after World War II.

Events
Since 2009 Novi Kozarci has been hosting Pie Fest  (srb: Pitijada) every last week in September. This event consists of various competitions: making the best traditional potato pie, making the longest pie (Pie for Guinness), fast pie eating competition (srb: Pitožder)  and sports competitions (srb:  Novokozarački Višeboj).

Ethnic groups (2002 census)

Serbs = 2,122 (93.19%)
Romani = 61 (2.68%)
Yugoslavs = 28 (1.23%)
Hungarians = 11 (0.48%)
others.

Historical population

1961: 3,668
1971: 3,068
1981: 2,668
1991: 2,488
2002: 2,277

See also
List of places in Serbia
List of cities, towns and villages in Vojvodina

References

Slobodan Ćurčić, Broj stanovnika Vojvodine, Novi Sad, 1996.

External links

Novi Kozarci (ADF/USAID)

Populated places in Serbian Banat
Kikinda